Louis Bertrand (12 October 1779 – 11 September 1871) was a Canadian seigneur, businessman and political figure.

Bertrand was born in Cap-Santé, Quebec in 1779. He worked as baker at the Petit Séminaire de Québec, then moved to L'Isle-Verte in 1811 and opened a store there. In 1818 and 1819, he leased the rights to the mill and seigneury at L'Isle-Verte; in 1849, he purchased the title to the seigneury. He built a sawmill and then another one in partnership with others. He also owned a wharf and boats at L'Isle-Verte. Bertrand was captain in the local militia, becoming lieutenant-colonel in 1862. He served as commissioner for the small claims tribunal. He was elected to represent Rimouski in the Legislative Assembly of Lower Canada in an 1832 by-election; he was reelected in 1834. Bertrand supported the Ninety-Two Resolutions. In 1844, he was elected to the Legislative Assembly of the Province of Canada for Rimouski. In 1845, he became the first mayor of L'Isle-Verte.

Bertrand died at L'Isle-Verte in 1871.

His son Charles was a member of the Canadian House of Commons.

His home at L'Isle-Verte, the Maison Louis-Bertrand, has been designated a National Historic Site of Canada.

References

External links

1779 births
1871 deaths
Members of the Legislative Assembly of Lower Canada
Members of the Legislative Assembly of the Province of Canada from Canada East
Mayors of places in Quebec